Knocknafenaig is a ruined township on the Isle of Mull, Scotland.

Located in the south-western portion of the island known as the Ross of Mull, Knocknafenaig is an extremely well preserved township that shows many characteristics of the 19th-century and early 20th-century  living conditions.  Although it is believed to have had medieval settlements, almost no evidence remains of these due to their organic nature.  Among the many ruins is a well preserved corn-drying kiln and house, known as Braigh.  The Braigh is the last remaining thatched building in the Ross of Mull and was inhabited until the mid-1980s.

The name Cnoc na Fennaig translates as "Hill of the Lazybeds" (this being a reference to the type of cultivation used throughout the area).

In 1779 the township had a population of 70.  After the Highland Clearances and the Potato Famine in the mid-19th century the township became increasingly deserted.  After World War I Knocknafenaig was divided into six crofts for returning servicemen.  Eventually the six crofts were combined to become Ardachy Farm.

References
1.  Ross of Mull Historical Centre, 2004 Discover The Ross...Uisken, Knocknafenaig & Ardalanish. Bunessan. Ross of Mull Historical Centre.

Villages on the Isle of Mull